This is a list of Members of Parliament (MPs) in the Cavalier Parliament which lasted from 8 May 1661 until 24 January 1679. It was the longest English Parliament, enduring for nearly 18 years of the quarter century reign of Charles II of England. Like its predecessor, the Convention Parliament, it was overwhelmingly Royalist and is also known as the Pensioner Parliament for the many pensions it granted to adherents of the King. It restored the Anglican church as the official church of England.

Surviving Royalist members who had been disabled from sitting in the Long Parliament in the 1640s and who were not allowed to sit in the intervening parliaments were allowed to stand again for parliament.

List of constituencies and members

This list contains details of the MPs elected in 1661.

See also
 1661 English general election

References

Cobbett's Parliamentary history of England, from the Norman Conquest in 1066 to the year 1803 (London: Thomas Hansard, 1808)

17th-century English parliaments
1661
 
1661 in England
1661 in politics
List